Robson Stevens (born 4 April 2002) is a professional rugby league footballer who last played as a  for the Huddersfield Giants in the Betfred Super League.

In 2021 he made his Super League début for the Giants against the Wigan Warriors.

References

2002 births
Living people
Dewsbury Rams players
English rugby league players
Rugby league props
Huddersfield Giants players